Merrill's Marauders is a 1962 Technicolor war film, photographed in CinemaScope, and directed and co-written by Samuel Fuller. It is based on the exploits of the long-range penetration jungle warfare unit of the same name in the Burma campaign, culminating in the Siege of Myitkyina.

The source is the nonfiction book The Marauders, written by Charlton Ogburn Jr., a communications officer who served with Merrill's Marauders. Filmed on location in the Philippines, the economical historical epic film stars Jeff Chandler (in his final role) as Frank Merrill and several actors from the Warner Bros. Television stock company, who were then the lead actors in American television shows. The supporting cast features Ty Hardin from Bronco, Peter Brown from Lawman, Andrew Duggan from Bourbon Street Beat, and Will Hutchins from Sugarfoot.

Plot

The  film begins with off-screen narration over black-and-white historical footage of the World War II Burma campaign, including mention of all nationalities of Allied forces who participated. The film then segues into color as Lt. Stockton's platoon moves through the jungle toward their first objective, the Japanese-held town of Walawbum. After Stockton radios Gen. Merrill that they are nearing their goal, the brigade carries out a successful raid.

Afterwards, General Joseph Stilwell arrives in Walawbum to order Merrill to take the railroad center of Shaduzup, and ultimately the strategic airstrip at Myitkyina. With reluctance, Merrill summons Stockton to brief him on their next mission, and the unit continues their march through hellish swamps before taking Shaduzup from the enemy.

The brigade continues the mission up steep mountains for several days and nights before digging in just outside the now-besieged Myitkyina. As night falls, the unit endures a massive artillery barrage. The next morning brings a Japanese banzai attack, which Merrill's men successfully repel. Then, while desperately rallying what is left of his unit to move on to the base at Myitkyina, the general suddenly collapses from a heart attack. The men, led by Stockton, slowly rise up and trudge onward toward Myitkyina as an incredulous "Doc" cradles Merrill in his arms. In fact, Doc's off-screen narration is heard next as he relates that Myitkyina was indeed taken.

Cast

The Marauders
Charles Ogburn was a communications officer who served with Merril's Marauders for six months in 1944. He wrote a warm poem about it, which was published in 1944.

He wrote a book called The Marauders, which was published in 1959. The New York Times called it "one of the noblest and most sensitive books by any American about his own experience in war." The Los Angeles Times called it "easily one of the best books to come out of World War II."

Development
In May 1959, film rights to the book were bought by producer Milton Sperling and his United States Pictures Productions.

In August, Charles Schnee was working on the script.

Sam Fuller
Sperling approached the experienced Samuel Fuller to write and direct The Marauders (the working title) in early 1961. Fuller was then attempting to have Warner Bros. finance and make his dream project, The Big Red One (like Ogburn, influenced by his own WWII combat experience), and initially refused Sperling's offer. Jack L. Warner summoned Fuller and told him that Merrill's Marauders would be a dry run for his The Big Red One.

Fuller's connection to the project was announced in November 1960.

For the lead role, Fuller wanted Gary Cooper, who refused it because of ill health (he died soon afterwards). Fuller was impressed with former Universal Pictures contract star Jeff Chandler and cast him. His casting was announced in March 1961.

Script
Samuel Fuller and Milton Sperling simplify, but follow the events and narrative of Ogburn's historical account, but they use the character structure of Denis and Terry Sanders's screenplay for The Naked and the Dead; an earnest young lieutenant "Stock" in command of a military intelligence and reconnaissance platoon is a mediator between his men and a fatherly  Brigadier General Frank Merrill. The screenplay also features a grave medical officer, "Doc", continually briefing Merrill on the physical and psychological condition of the men and on Merrill himself.

Stock and Doc are a Greek chorus who explain decisions, morale, and conditions to the audience. Unlike the characters in The Naked and the Dead, who continually have flashbacks and viciously hate each other, the Marauders are professional veterans who respect each other. They gradually deteriorate when the one mission becomes two, then three, then an endless one, and a beat-the-clock narrative in capturing an airstrip before the monsoon grounds aircraft. The audience sees the effects on the men of not only enemy action, but also hunger, tropical diseases, disorientation, sleep deprivation, and breakdown (physical, moral, mental). The soldiers continue, demonstrating superb combat leadership, professionalism, sacrifice, and endurance.

Shooting
The film was shot in the Philippines, with 1200 soldiers from the Armed Forces of the Philippines, American soldiers of the 1st U.S. Army Special Forces Group at Okinawa and Clark Air Force Base, and cast the leading roles with several Warner Bros.  contract stars who were then the leading men of popular programs, but would not be paid extra salary, three stuntmen (Chuck Roberson, Jack Williams, and Chuck Hicks), two Filipino film stars, and the film's technical advisor. Due to bad weather, Fuller shot six days over the allotted 41-day shooting schedule.

The company's name, United States Pictures Productions, gave the Philippine government and the film crews the impression that they were working with a branch of the United States government and they enthusiastically co-operated with the producer.

Merrill's Marauders was photographed by William H. Clothier, who used a trick from his work on The Alamo - silence precedes and follows the loud battle scenes. Fuller also eschewed sound effects for  the sound of blanks. The U.S. Army was upset at the mood of and events in the film, particularly scenes in the Shaduzup maze of GIs accidentally killing other GIs, and had the scenes deleted.  The original Shadazup maze scene was a single take with panning across the battle instead of cutting to close-ups of who was shooting whom. The studio told Fuller it looked "too artistic" and had a second unit director reshoot some of the scenes (only one scene appeared in the final print), and also changed the original ending to feature soldiers on dress parade, which angered Fuller; he fought the studio, and they dropped plans to film The Big Red One.

Stock footage and music
Another example of the economical production of the film was using extensive stock footage battle scenes from Battle Cry in the attack at Walawbum.  Warner Bros. also used bits of Max Steiner's score for Operation Pacific and  Franz Waxman's score from Objective, Burma! that was also used in Warner's Up Periscope (1959).  The 1885 tune "American Patrol" is heard in not only the final parade scene, but also in bits throughout the film that either indicates that the film was scored after the addition of the changed ending or that "American Patrol" may have been the original title music rather than Howard Jackson's title theme.

Reception
Merrill's Marauders was critically and financially successful, and was the final Warner Bros. film made in CinemaScope. The film was illustrated in a movie tie-in Dell Comics American comic book. Eighteen years after this film, Sam Fuller made another war film, The Big Red One, this time based on his own combat experiences in wartime Europe.

Death of Jeff Chandler
During the film, Jeff Chandler, who had back problems, injured himself playing baseball with some of the American soldiers working on the film. Despite the pain, Chandler had injections and continued filming; his pain is noticeable. On returning to the U.S., he died under anesthesia during back surgery.

See also
 List of American films of 1962

References

External links
 
 
 
 
 Merrill's Marauders at the Movies http://www.marauder.org/movie.htm
 
 comic book of the film http://www.marauder.org/comic.htm
 Peter Brown website of the film https://web.archive.org/web/20090210003249/http://www.peterbrown.tv/merrills.html
 Will Hutchins' memories http://www.westernclippings.com/hutch/hutch_2008_02.shtml

1962 films
1960s English-language films
1962 war films
American films based on actual events
American World War II films
Films directed by Samuel Fuller
Burma Campaign films
Films set in Myanmar
Films set in 1944
Warner Bros. films
World War II films based on actual events
Films adapted into comics
Films shot in the Philippines
Films about United States Army Rangers
Japan in non-Japanese culture
CinemaScope films
1960s American films